Goh Dong-min (born 12 January 1999) is a South Korean footballer who currently plays as a goalkeeper for K League 2 club Gyeongnam FC.

Career statistics

Club
.

Notes

References

External links

1999 births
Living people
South Korean footballers
South Korea youth international footballers
South Korean expatriate footballers
Association football goalkeepers
J3 League players
K League 2 players
Matsumoto Yamaga FC players
Vanraure Hachinohe players
Gyeongnam FC players
South Korean expatriate sportspeople in Japan
Expatriate footballers in Japan